Magnox is an alloy—mainly of magnesium with small amounts of aluminium and other metals—used in cladding unenriched uranium metal fuel with a non-oxidising covering to contain fission products in nuclear reactors.
Magnox is short for Magnesium non-oxidising.
This material has the advantage of a low neutron capture cross section, but has two major disadvantages:
It limits the maximum temperature (to about 415 Celsius), and hence the thermal efficiency, of the plant.
It reacts with water, preventing long-term storage of spent fuel under water in spent fuel pools.

The magnox alloy Al80 has a composition of 0.8% aluminium and 0.004% beryllium.

See also
 Magnox nuclear power reactors.

References

Magnesium alloys
Nuclear materials
Aluminium–magnesium alloys
Aluminium alloys